Robert Sturdy (born 22 June 1944, in Wetherby, West Riding of Yorkshire) is a British politician, and former Member of the European Parliament  (MEP) for the East of England constituency for the Conservative Party. He held the seat from 1999 until 2014. Before then, he was the MEP for Cambridge and Bedfordshire North, from 1994 to 1999.

Sturdy was educated at the independent Ashville College. Before being elected he was a farmer and is a former county chair of the Young Farmers.

His son, Julian Sturdy, is the Conservative MP for York Outer.

External links
Conservative Party: Official biography
Profile on European Parliament website

1944 births
Living people
People educated at Ashville College
Conservative Party (UK) MEPs
People from Wetherby
MEPs for England 1994–1999
MEPs for England 1999–2004
MEPs for England 2004–2009
MEPs for England 2009–2014